Kutjevo is a town in eastern Croatia. It is located in the Slavonia region, northeast of town of Požega.

History

Kutjevo is known for its wines, and the local agricultural joint stock company Kutjevo d.d. is the largest exporter of wines in Croatia. There are numerous winegrowers residing in Kutjevo, like Enjingi and Krauthaker.

Population
The 2011 census showed there were 6,247 people in the municipality and 2,440 in the town itself, with 95% of the population declaring themselves Croats.

Settlements
The settlements included in the administrative area of Kutjevo include:

 Bektež, population 388
 Bjeliševac, population 112
 Ciglenik, population 143
 Ferovac, population 103
 Grabarje, population 490
 Gradište, population 152
 Rnjevac, population 174
 Kula, population 331
 Kutjevo, population 2,440
 Lukač, population 150
 Mitrovac, population 133
 Ovčare, population 123
 Poreč, population 119
 Šumanovci, population 139
 Tominovac, population 164
 Venje, population 98
 Vetovo, population 988

See also 
 Turković family

References

External links

Slavonia
Cities and towns in Croatia
Populated places in Požega-Slavonia County